Fighter Squadron 132 or VF-132 was a short-lived aviation unit of the United States Navy established on 21 August 1961 and disestablished on 1 October 1962.

Operational history

VF-132 was established as part of Carrier Air Group 13. After returning from the cruise, CVG-13 and its constituent squadrons were disestablished on 1 October 1962.

Home port assignments
The squadron was assigned to NAS Cecil Field.

Aircraft assignment
Vought F-8 Crusader

See also

History of the United States Navy
List of inactive United States Navy aircraft squadrons
List of United States Navy aircraft squadrons

References

External links

Strike fighter squadrons of the United States Navy